Zharskiy (also, Zharovskiye) is a village in the Masally Rayon of Azerbaijan.

References 

Populated places in Masally District